The Slovenian Rowing Federation is the governing body of rowing in Slovenia. It is responsible for Slovenian national Rowing team, and organization of the international regattas, World Cup in Rowing, Bled 2010 and World Rowing Championships in Bled 2011.

The federation was formed in 1952. It is a member of the Slovenian Olympic Committee and the International Federation of Rowing Associations

It organized the World Rowing Championships on Bled in 1966, 1979, 1989, and will host it again in 2011

Presidents
Slobodan Radujko 1994–2004
Tomo Levovnik 2004–2009
Denis Žvegelj 2009–2013
Jošt Dolničar 2013-

Major achievements
Slovenian rowers have many international successes in World Rowing Championships, European Rowing Championships, Junior World Rowing Championships, U23 World Rowing Championships and Olympic Games 
Seoul 1988 Olympic Games bronze medal 2- (Coxless pair) Sadik Mujkič, Bojan Prešern (racing as Yugoslavia)
Barcelona 1992 Olympic Games bronze medal 2- (Coxless pair) Denis Žvegelj, Iztok Čop
Barcelona 1992 Olympic Games bronze medal 4- (Coxless four)  Sadik Mujkič, Milan Janša, Sašo Mirjanič, Jani Klemenčič
Sydney 2000 Olympic Games gold medal 2x (Double scull) Iztok Čop, Luka Špik
Athens 2004 Olympic Games silver medal 2x (Double scull) Iztok Čop, Luka Špik
London 2012 Olympic Games bronze medal 2x (Double scull) Iztok Čop, Luka Špik
National coach for all winning medals was Miloš Janša

References
Rowing Federation of Slovenia

Slovenia
Rowing
Rowing in Slovenia
1952 establishments in Slovenia